Narkis is a surname from the Hebrew form of Narcissus. It may refer to:

 Bezalel Narkiss (1926-2008), Israeli art historian
 Lior Narkis (born 1976), Israeli singer
 Uzi Narkis (1925-1997), Israeli general

See also 
 Narcissus (disambiguation)

Hebrew-language surnames
Jewish surnames